Patrick Daniel Joseph Wright (born 17 November 1940) is an English football coach and former professional player who made 230 appearances in the Football League playing for Birmingham City, Shrewsbury Town, Derby County, Southend United and Rotherham United. He played as a full back. He has coached at club and national level all over the world.

Career
Wright was born in Oldbury, Worcestershire, and turned professional with Birmingham City in 1959. He made his debut in the First Division on 28 November 1959, deputising for Brian Farmer in a 2–1 defeat at Blackburn Rovers, but played only twice more for the first team at the end of the 1961–62 season before moving to Third Division club Shrewsbury Town. Wright spent the majority of his active playing career with Shrewsbury, making more than 200 appearances for the club. He went on to play for Derby County and Southend United before making his first foray into coaching as player-coach at Rotherham United.

In 1971, he was appointed player-manager of Waterlooville of the Southern League, leading them to the Division One South title in his first season, and then joined Portsmouth, initially as reserve team coach and later as chief coach. He went on to coach all over the world, including spells with the Saudi Arabia and United Arab Emirates national football teams, and scouted both in England and abroad. He set up his own coaching company which has operated since 1980, and was on the planning committee of the Football Association's School of Excellence.

References

1940 births
Living people
People from Oldbury, West Midlands
English footballers
Association football fullbacks
Birmingham City F.C. players
Shrewsbury Town F.C. players
Derby County F.C. players
Southend United F.C. players
Rotherham United F.C. players
Waterlooville F.C. players
English Football League players
English football managers